Bromsberrow (or Bromesberrow) is part of the Forest of Dean district. The village is close to the meeting point between Gloucestershire, Herefordshire, and Worcestershire. The nearest town is Ledbury, about four miles north in Herefordshire.

A resident of the village named Emily Bishop (c1879-1961) was recorded extensively singing traditional folk songs by the folklorist Peter Kennedy in 1952.

The village was briefly home to Richard Hammond, the former Top Gear presenter, who resided on a farm next to St. Mary's Church.

Identify as Bremesbyrig
Anglo-Saxon Chronicle states that in 910 Aethelflaed constructed a stronghold at "Bremesbyrig"; the location is suspected either being Bromsberry or Bromsgrove.

Gallery

References

External links

Forest of Dean
Villages in Gloucestershire
Civil parishes in Gloucestershire